Raj B. Shetty is an Indian actor, director, and screenwriter who works in Kannada film industry. He has directed and acted in the films, Ondu Motteya Kathe and Garuda Gamana Vrishabha Vahana.

Filmography

As an actor

As director and writer

Awards

References

Sources
 
 
 
 
 

Living people
21st-century Indian film directors
21st-century Indian male actors
Indian male film actors
Kannada film directors
Male actors in Kannada cinema
1987 births